Gombito is a comune (municipality) in the Province of Cremona in the Italian region Lombardy, located about  southeast of Milan and about  northwest of Cremona.

Gombito borders the following municipalities: Bertonico, Castelleone, Castiglione d'Adda, Formigara, Ripalta Arpina, San Bassano.

References

Cities and towns in Lombardy